AccessBank may refer to:

 AccessBank Group, a group of micro-financial institutions started by and majority owned by AccessHolding, a German financial conglomerate
 AccessBank Azerbaijan, a microfinance bank in Azerbaijan
 AccessBank Liberia, a microfinance bank in Liberia
 AccessBank Tanzania, a microfinance bank in Tanzania 
 AccessBank Zambia, a microfinance bank in Zambia
 AccessBank Liberia, a microfinance bank in Liberia